Gunnar Martinsson was a Swedish footballer who played as a midfielder.

References

Association football midfielders
Swedish footballers
Allsvenskan players
Malmö FF players
Year of birth missing